WAOG-LP is a Religious formatted broadcast radio station licensed to Aberdeen, North Carolina, serving the Aberdeen/Whispering Pines area.  WAOG-LP is owned and operated by Calvary Chapel of the Sandhills.

External links
 

AOG-LP
AOG-LP